Ichneutica erebia is a moth of the family Noctuidae. This species is endemic to New Zealand and is found on Campbell Island and the Auckland Islands. Adults of this species are on the wing from August to January. The adults are variable in appearance but can be distinguished from similar species by the patters or lack thereof on their forewings. The larvae of I. erebia are polyphagous and hosts include Pleurophyllum criniferum, species within the genera Stilbocarpa and Carex, as well as Chionochloa antarctica'''', Urtica australis and Raukaua simplex.

Taxonomy 

This species was first described by George Hudson in 1909 using a single female specimen collected by R. Browne at Erebus Cove at Port Ross. Hudson originally named the species Melanchra erebia. The holotype specimen is held at the Museum of New Zealand Te Papa Tongarewa. In 1956 John Salmon, thinking he was describing a new species, named it Melanchra oceanica. In 1971 this name was synonymised with Melanchra erebia by J. S. Dugdale and the species was treated by him as being a subspecies of Graphania mutans, that is Graphania mutans erebia. In his 1988 catalogue Dugdale reconsidered and raised the species to species rank, discussing it under the name Graphania erebia. In 2019 Robert Hoare undertook a major review of New Zealand Noctuidae species. During this review the genus Ichneutica was greatly expanded and the genus Graphania was subsumed into that genus as a synonym. As a result of this review, this species is now known as Ichneutica erebia.

Description
Dugdale gives a detailed description of the larva of I. erebia in his 1971 publication and described the pupa as follows:

Hudson described the adults of the species as follows:
The male of the species has a wingspan of between 33 and 43 mm and the female has a wingspan of between 39 and 43 mm. I. erebia is a variable species. It may possibly be confused with I. pagaia but can be distinguished by the pattern on the forewings of the later species. Hoare states that the forewings of I. erebia "lack the distinct W-shaped evagination of the forewing subterminal line" found on specimens of I. pagaia.

Distribution 
This species is endemic to New Zealand and is found on Campbell Island and the Auckland Islands.

Habitat 
I. erebia is adapted to existing in subantarctic habitat.

Behaviour 
The adults of this species are on the wing from August to January. This species of moth has been shown to be capable of pollinating subantarctic plants.

Life history and host species 

The larvae of I. erebia feeds on various herbaceous plants with known hosts being Pleurophyllum criniferum as well as species of Stilbocarpa and Carex. Chionochloa antarctica, Urtica australis and Raukaua simplex are all probable hosts as larvae of I. erebia have also been found on these species.

References 

Hadeninae
Moths of New Zealand
Endemic fauna of New Zealand
Moths described in 1909
Taxa named by George Hudson
Endemic moths of New Zealand